Antoine Bourges is a French-Canadian filmmaker and screenwriter. He is most noted for his 2012 mid-length docudrama film East Hastings Pharmacy, which was the winner of the Colin Low Award at the 2013 DOXA Documentary Film Festival, and his 2017 narrative feature film Fail to Appear, which was a Vancouver Film Critics Circle nominee for Best Canadian Film at the Vancouver Film Critics Circle Awards 2017.

Originally from Paris, he moved to Canada as a teenager to play ice hockey; after failing to make the National Hockey League, he studied film at the University of British Columbia and York University. He remains based in Vancouver as a professor in the film program at UBC. He made a number of short films prior to East Hastings Pharmacy; the most noted of these, Woman Waiting, premiered at the 2010 Toronto International Film Festival, and was screened at the 2011 Berlin International Film Festival.

His newest film, Concrete Valley, premiered in the Wavelengths program at the 2022 Toronto International Film Festival. It is also slated to screen at the 73rd Berlin Film Festival on 21 February 2023.

Filmography
Hello Goodbye - 2008
People Were There - 2008
Woman Waiting - 2010
East Hastings Pharmacy - 2012
William in White Shirt - 2015
Fail to Appear - 2017
Concrete Valley - 2022

References

External links

21st-century Canadian male writers
21st-century Canadian screenwriters
21st-century French male writers
21st-century French screenwriters
Canadian male screenwriters
French male screenwriters
French emigrants to Canada
Film directors from Paris
Film directors from Vancouver
Writers from Paris
Writers from Vancouver
University of British Columbia alumni
Academic staff of the University of British Columbia
York University alumni
Year of birth missing (living people)
Living people